This is the discography of American hip hop musician Sir Michael Rocks.

Albums

Studio albums

Collaborative albums

Extended plays

Mixtapes

Singles

Guest appearances

References

Discographies of American artists
Hip hop discographies